Louis-Désiré Maigret, SS.CC., (September 14, 1804 – June 11, 1882), served as the first vicar apostolic of the Vicariate Apostolic of the Sandwich Islands; now the Roman Catholic Diocese of Honolulu. Born in Saint-Pierre-de-Maillé (France), Maigret was ordained to the priesthood as a member of the Congregation of the Sacred Hearts of Jesus and Mary on September 23, 1828, at the age of 24.  As part of his missionary work, Father Maigret sailed to the Kingdom of Hawaii to l.p. build its Catholic community of native Hawaiians.

The diocese sent him as a missionary to Pohnpei in Micronesia in December 1837 on the schooner Notre Dame de Paix. He was the first missionary they had seen. In his company were "several Mangarevans and Tahitians," some of whom remained on Pohnpei and left descendants. He departed on 29 July 1838 for Valparaiso after seven unsuccessful months.

When the Vicar Apostolic of Oriental Oceania, Msgr. Étienne Rouchouze, SS.CC., was lost at sea on board the ill-fated Marie Joseph in early 1843, the Holy See appointed Father Maigret as the first vicar  apostolic of the Sandwich Islands on September 11, 1846, at the age of 42. He was officially ordained as a bishop of the titular see of Arathia (Arad) on November 28, 1847, at the age of 43.  Bishop Maigret oversaw the construction of what would become his most lasting legacy, the Cathedral Basilica of Our Lady of Peace.

After his death,  Maigret was entombed in the crypt below the sanctuary.

References

1804 births
1882 deaths
Apostolic vicars of the Hawaiian Islands
Picpus Fathers
Roman Catholic missionaries in Hawaii
French Roman Catholic missionaries
Roman Catholic missionaries in the Federated States of Micronesia